3G MIMO describes MIMO techniques which have been considered as 3G standard techniques.
 
MIMO, as the state of the art of intelligent antenna (IA), improves the performance of radio systems by embedding electronics intelligence into the spatial processing unit. Spatial processing includes spatial precoding at the transmitter and spatial postcoding at the receiver, which are dual each other from information signal processing theoretic point of view. Intelligent antenna is technology which represents smart antenna, multiple antenna (MIMO), self-tracking directional antenna, cooperative virtual antenna and so on.

Technology 
Spatial precoding of intelligent antenna includes spatial beamforming and spatial coding. In wireless communications, spatial precoding has been developing for high reliability, high rate and lower interference as shown in the following table.

Summary of 3G MIMO 
The table summarizes the history of 3G MIMO techniques candidated for 3G standards. Although the table additionally contains the future part but the contents are not clearly filled out since the future is not precisely predictable.

IA in ad hoc networking 

IA technology enables client terminals, which have either multiple antennas or a self-tracking directional antenna, to communicate to each other with as high as possible signal-to-interference-and-noise ratio (SINR). Assume that there is a source terminal, a destination terminal, and some candidate interference terminals. Compared to conventional approaches, an advanced IA based terminal will perform spatial precoding (spatial beamforming and/or spatial coding) not only to enhance the signal power at the destination terminal but also to diminish the interfering power at interference terminals. As a human does, the advanced IA terminal is given to know that occurring high interference to other terminals will eventually degrade the performance of the associated wireless network.

Principal Issues of Research 

The following items list the issues of the multiple antenna research aims to improve the performance of radio communications.

 Intelligent antenna
 Smart antenna
 Digital antenna array
 Multiple-input multiple-output (MIMO)
 Beamforming
 Diversity combining
 Diversity scheme
 Space–time code
 Spatial multiplexing
 Space-division multiple access (SDMA)
 Advanced MIMO communications
 Multi-user MIMO
 Precoding
 Dirty paper coding (DPC)
 Cooperative wireless communications
 Cooperative diversity

Principal Definitions

Definitions 
Here are the definition of principal keywords to clarify the objective and the operations of intelligent antenna.

Reference Web Sites 
The following items list the web sites related to the multiple antenna research.

 MARS, Bell Laboratories — 
 Multiple Antenna Research and Solutions (MARS) is a research group on multiple antenna and space time coding
 Lucent — 
 The goal of intelligent antennas is to achieve higher capacity noting that advanced solutions provide higher capacity than basic solutions.

 IMEC — 
 Multiple antenna systems are the key to the high-capacity wireless universe. Indeed, they allow increasing the rate, improving the robustness, or accommodating more users in the cell.
 Georgia Institute of Technology — 
 A smart antenna is an array of antenna elements connected to a digital signal processor
 IEC — 
 A smart antenna system combines multiple antenna elements with a signal-processing capability to optimize its radiation and/or reception pattern automatically in response to the signal environment.
 Spatial division multiple access (SDMA) — Among the most sophisticated utilizations of smart antenna technology is SDMA, which employs advanced processing techniques to, in effect, locate and track fixed or mobile terminals, adaptively steering transmission signals toward users and away from interferers.
 SearchMobileComputing.com — 
 A smart antenna is a digital wireless communications antenna system that takes advantage of diversity effect at the source (transmitter), the destination (receiver), or both.
 MIMO is an antenna technology for wireless communications in which multiple antennas are used at both the source (transmitter) and the destination (receiver).
 Smart Antennas Research Group, Stanford Univ. — 
 Our research goal is to advance the state-of-the-art in the applications of multiple antennas and space-time signal processing in mobile wireless networks, and to improve network performance and economics.
 CDG — 
 Smart antennas provide greater capacity and performance benefits than standard antennas because they can be used to customize and fine-tune antenna coverage patterns that match the traffic conditions in a wireless network or that are better suited for complex radio frequency (RF) environments.
 MIMO employs multiple, spatially separated antennas (at both TX and RX) to take advantage of these "virtual wires" and transfer more data.
 Nortel — 
 MIMO is an antenna technology that is used both in transmission and receiver equipment for wireless radio communication.
 MIMO is the only advanced antenna technology that simultaneously offers high bandwidth, improved range, and high mobility at a lower cost.
 Visant Strategies — 
 Intelligent antennas are antenna systems that use some sort of computational or electronic resource to enhance system performance.
 According to the amounts of intelligence employed, antenna diversity represents the simplest form in the progressive complexity chain, followed by basic beamforming, which is the process of narrowing radiated energy, which is then followed by the more complex space-time processing and finally by MIMO.
 Magnetic Sciences — 
 Satellite tracking systems and self-steering antennas are used aboard ships, vehicles, or aircraft to maintain contact  with satellites.

See also
 Antenna diversity
 Smart antenna
 Multiple antenna research
 Multiple-input multiple-output communications
 Cooperative wireless communications
 Precoding includes spatial coding (SC) and spatial beamforming (SB)
 Space–time code
 Spatial multiplexing
 Dirty paper coding (DPC)
 Beamforming
 Wsdma
 Smart antenna for 3G MIMO benefits

References

 Dr. Erik Dahlman, LTE, 3G Long Term Evolution

External links
 Smart Antennas and Related Technologies Briefing published by Bell Labs, Lucent Technologies

IEEE 802
Information theory
Radio resource management